Nance is a 1920 British silent drama film directed by Albert Ward and starring Isobel Elsom, James Lindsay and Ivan Samson. It was based on the novel Nance by Charles Garvice. It depicts the relationship between an aristocratic man and a working-class woman.

Cast
 Isobel Elsom as Nance Gray 
 James Lindsay as Lord Stoyle 
 Ivan Samson as Bernard Yorke 
 Mary Forbes as Felicia Damarche 
 J.R. Crawford   
 Percival Clarke  
 Bassett Roe   
 Howard Sturge

References

Bibliography
 Bamford, Kenton. Distorted Images: British National Identity and Film in the 1920s. I.B. Tauris, 1999.
 Low, Rachael. History of the British Film, 1918-1929. George Allen & Unwin, 1971.

External links

1920 films
1920 drama films
British drama films
British silent feature films
Films directed by Albert Ward
Films based on American novels
Films set in England
British black-and-white films
1920s English-language films
1920s British films
Silent drama films